The AIR Awards of 2019 is the thirteenth annual Australian Independent Record Labels Association Music Awards (generally known as the AIR Awards) and was an award ceremony at Freemasons Hall Adelaide, Australia on Thursday 25 July 2019.

The award for Best Independent Album was a tie between Courtney Barnett and Gurrumul.

Performers
B Wise - "The Key"
G Flip - "About You"
Laura Jean - "Girls on the TV"
Mojo Juju - "Native Tongue"
West Thebarton

Outstanding Achievement Award
Gerarda McKenna

Nominees and winners

AIR Awards
Winners are listed first and highlighted in boldface; other final nominees are listed alphabetically.

See also
Music of Australia

References

2019 in Australian music
2019 music awards
AIR Awards